Mahapurush is a 1965 film directed by Satyajit Ray, based on a short story Birinchibaba (বিরিঞ্চি বাবা) by Rajshekhar Basu.

Plot 
After the death of his wife, Gurupada Mitra (Prasad Mukherjee), an advocate, has not been at peace. He and his daughter Buchki (Gitali Roy), meet Birinchi (Charuprakash Ghosh). Birinchi Baba claims to be ageless. He tells stories from the past; about his arguments with 'Plato' about time, how he taught E=mc2 to Einstein, and was on first-name terms with Jesu (Christ) and Gautam (Buddha). Birinchi Baba has a growing band of rich devotees.

Gurupada decides to patronize the holy man and become his disciple. Daughter Buchki is disappointed with her lover Satya. To teach him a lesson, she tells Satya that she is going to leave him and become a disciple of Birinchi Baba.

Satya turns to his friend Nibaran for his help. It does not take Nibaran long to realize that Birinchi Baba is a fraud. Nibaran and friends expose Birinchi Baba. The devotees feel foolish and perhaps have learnt a lesson.

Cast
 Charuprakash Ghosh as Birinchi Baba, the self-proclaimed Godman and the con-artist
 Rabi Ghosh as Birinchi Baba's assistant, his disciple/(originally) his nephew Kyabla
 Somen Bose as Nibaran da
 Satya Bandopadhyay as Nitai da
 Haridhan Mukherjee as Ganesh Mama
 Satindra Bhattacharya as Satya
 Santosh Dutta as Professor Nani
 Geetali Roy as Buchki/Neelima, Gurupada's younger daughter
 Prasad Mukherjee as Gurupada Mittir
 Renuka Roy as Nani's wife/Gurupada's elder daughter

Preservation
The Academy Film Archive preserved Mahapurush in 2005.

References

External links
 Mahapurush (SatyajitRay.org)
 

1965 films
Films directed by Satyajit Ray
Bengali-language Indian films
Films about religion
Films with screenplays by Satyajit Ray
1960s Bengali-language films